Paracles amarga is a moth of the subfamily Arctiinae first described by Schaus in 1933. It is found in Argentina.

References

Moths described in 1933
Paracles